WWL may refer to:
 Willa's Wild Life, TV series
 World Wrestling League, a professional wrestling promotion in Puerto Rico
 World Wrestling Legends, a professional wrestling promotion based in the United States
 Wallenius Wilhelmsen Logistics, Norwegian and Swedish RORO shipping company and logistics provider
 WWL (AM), a radio station (870 AM) licensed to New Orleans, Louisiana, United States
 WWL-FM, a radio station (105.3 FM) licensed to Kenner, Louisiana, simulcasting WWL
 WWL-TV, a television station (channel 27, virtual 4) licensed to New Orleans, Louisiana